David Wakefield may refer to:

 David Wakefield (cricketer) (born 1994), American cricketer
 David Wakefield (rugby league) (1936–2022), English rugby league player
 Dave Wakefield (born 1965), English footballer